Ziya Şengül (1944 – 26 February 2023) was a Turkish footballer who played as a midfielder. He is remembered for his commanding role during his career at Turkish club Fenerbahçe and also for his great effort at the famous draw of the Turkey national team against Italy.

Şengül made 21 appearances for the Turkey between 1964 to 1975.

Şengül died from organ failure on 26 February 2023. He was buried at Aşiyan Asri Cemetery.

References

External links
 

1944 births
2023 deaths
Turkish footballers
Association football midfielders
Turkey international footballers
Turkey youth international footballers
Turkey under-21 international footballers
Burials at Aşiyan Asri Cemetery
Süper Lig players
Fenerbahçe S.K. footballers
Turkish football managers
Süper Lig managers
Fenerbahçe football managers